Liu Guangbiao (Cantonese: Lau4 Yim2 Biu1; born September 5, 1978 in Guangzhou, Guangdong, China) is a Chinese baseball infielder for the Guangdong Leopards. He was a member of the China national baseball team competing in the 2009 World Baseball Classic.

References

1978 births
2006 World Baseball Classic players
2009 World Baseball Classic players
Baseball players at the 2002 Asian Games
Baseball players at the 2006 Asian Games
Chinese baseball players
Living people
Sportspeople from Guangzhou
Asian Games competitors for China
21st-century Chinese people